This is a list of mayors of the 25 largest cities in Oregon.

See also
 List of mayors of Bend, Oregon
 List of mayors of Eugene, Oregon
 List of mayors of Hillsboro, Oregon
 List of mayors of Milwaukie, Oregon
 List of mayors of Portland, Oregon

References